Tay is a name used as a surname and a given name. Tay is also a nickname and sometimes a short form (hypocorism) of the given name Taylor. Tay is also an alternative form for Zheng (surname). Notable people with the name include:

People with the surname
Alaric Tay (born 1979), Singaporean director, producer and actor
Bryan Tay, (born 1988), Singaporean swimmer
Daniel Tay (born 1991), American actor and voice actor
Jacelyn Tay (born 1975), Singaporean actress
John Tay (1832–1892), American Seventh-day Adventist missionary known for his pioneering work in the South Pacific
Michael Tay, Ambassador Extraordinary and Plenipotentiary of the Republic of Singapore to the Russian Federation
Moses Tay, 7th Bishop of Singapore and first Archbishop of the Province of Anglican Church in South East Asia
Patrick Tay (born 1971), Singaporean politician
Ronnie Tay (born 1963), Singaporean civil servant and former naval admiral
Sharon Tay (born 1966), American journalist and former television host
Simon Tay, Singaporean law professor, author and former Nominated Member of Parliament
Waren Tay, British ophthalmologist
Tay Chow Lyang, Singaporean murder victim in an unsolved double murder case that occurred in Sydney
Tay Geok Teat (1832–1893), Chinese merchant from Singapore
Tay Sek Tin (1872–1944), Chinese pastor who lived in Singapore
Robert Tay Bak Hong, one of the three murder victims of the Andrew Road triple murders case in 1983
Dawn Jacinta Tay Aishan, survivor of the Andrew Road triple murders case in 1983

People with the given name
Tay Gowan (born 1998), American football player
Tay Za (born 1964), Burmese businessman

People with the nickname
Tiago Amaral (born 1999), Portuguese singer and dancer known as TAY
Adam Bahner (born 1982), American singer, voice actor and YouTube personality better known as Tay Zonday
Taylor "Tay" Baker, American retired college basketball player and coach (active from 1947 to 1979)
Tay Cody (born 1977), American former National Football League and Canadian Football League player
Tay Garnett (1894–1977), American film director and writer
Tay Glover-Wright (born 1992), American football player
Tay Hohoff (1898–1974), American literary editor
Taylor Jardine (born 1990), American singer-songwriter, lead vocalist of the pop punk band We Are the In Crowd
Tay Melo (born 1995), Brazilian professional wrestler
Tayshaun Prince (born 1980), American retired National Basketball Association player
Taylor Swift (born 1989), American singer-songwriter also nicknamed Tay or Taytay
Tawan Vihokratana (born 1991), Thai actor known as Tay
Antabia Waller (born 1988), American professional basketball player

See also 

 Taytay (disambiguation)

Lists of people by nickname
Hypocorisms